Athetini is a tribe of rove beetles in the family Staphylinidae. There are at least 50 genera and 430 described species in Athetini.

Genera

References

Further reading

 
 
 
 
 
 
 
 

Aleocharinae